Lieutenant General Sir David Henderson,  (11 August 1862 – 17 August 1921) was the senior leader of British military aviation during the First World War, having previously established himself as the leading authority on tactical intelligence in the British Army. He served as the commander of the Royal Flying Corps in the field during the first year of the First World War and was instrumental in establishing the Royal Air Force as an independent service. After the war Henderson was the first Director-General of the League of Red Cross Societies.

Early and family life
David Henderson was born in Glasgow on 11 August 1862 into a ship-owning family. His father, also called David Henderson, was a joint owner of the Clydeside ship builders David and William Henderson and Company.

Henderson entered the University of Glasgow in 1877 at the age of just 15. While there, he read engineering and in his fourth year (1880–1881) he studied civil engineering and mechanics as well as office and field work in engineering. For reasons now unknown, he left the university to train for a military career at the Royal Military College, Sandhurst, instead of graduating from Glasgow.

In 1895, Henderson married Henrietta Caroline Dundas (11 December 1867 – 14 April 1959), who was appointed as a Dame Commander of the Order of the British Empire (DBE) in 1919. Their children included Ian Henry David Henderson, who also joined the Royal Flying Corps, but Ian Henderson predeceased his parents, dying in a flying accident in June 1918.

Military career

Following officer training at the Royal Military College Sandhurst, Henderson was commissioned into the British Army on 25 August 1883, joining the Argyll and Sutherland Highlanders as a lieutenant. He was promoted to captain on 26 February 1890, and graduated from Staff College, Camberley in 1895. Subsequently, he was a member of the Nile Expedition of 1898, following which he received a brevet promotion to the rank of major on 16 November 1898.

Three months before the outbreak of the Second Boer War Henderson was posted to Natal as an intelligence officer. During the opening stage of the war he took part and was wounded at the Siege of Ladysmith. He received a brevet promotion to lieutenant-colonel on 29 November 1900. In February 1901, the commander-in-chief in South Africa, Lord Kitchener, appointed Henderson his director of military intelligence, a post he held until the end of the war in June 1902. In a despatch dated 23 June 1902, Kitchener wrote how Henderson had "invariable done his best to cope with the great difficulties of his position." For his service in the war, he was awarded the Distinguished Service Order (DSO) in the October 1902 South Africa Honours list. His subsequent works, Field Intelligence: Its Principles and Practice (1904) and The Art of Reconnaissance (1907), did much to establish his reputation as the Army's authority on tactical intelligence.

In 1911, at the age of 49, Henderson learned to fly, making him the world's oldest pilot at that time. He formed part of the technical sub-committee of the Air Committee which helped to decide the organisation of the Royal Flying Corps, which was formed on 13 April 1912. In 1913 the control of military aviation was separated from the responsibilities of the Master-General of the Ordnance. A new Department of Military Aeronautics was established and Henderson was appointed the first director and, with the outbreak of the First World War, he took up command of the Royal Flying Corps in the Field. On 22 November 1914, Henderson was appointed General Officer Commanding the 1st Division and his chief of staff Frederick Sykes took up command in his stead. However, Henderson did not spend long commanding the 1st Infantry Division. The decision to post Henderson and replace him with Sykes was not to Lord Kitchener's liking, and he ordered a reversal of the appointments. On 20 December 1914, Henderson resumed command of the Royal Flying Corps in the Field and Sykes was once again his chief of staff.

In 1915 Henderson returned to London to resume his London-based duties as director-general of military aeronautics, which Sefton Brancker had been performing in his absence.  This meant that when, in 1917, General Jan Smuts was writing his review of the British Air Services, Henderson was well placed to assist. While seconded to General Smuts, Henderson wrote much of what came to be called the Smuts Report. It has been argued that he had a better claim to the informal title "father of the Royal Air Force" than Sir Hugh Trenchard. Trenchard himself believed that Henderson deserved the accolade. He sat on the government's "Advisory Committee for Aeronautics", located at the National Physical Laboratory, under the chairmanship of Richard Glazebrook and presidency of John Strutt, Lord Rayleigh.

In January 1918, Henderson was made a member of the Air Council, serving as its vice-president. However, having not been appointed as the RAF's Chief of the Air Staff, Henderson resigned from the Air Council in April, citing his desire to escape the atmosphere of intrigue at the Air Ministry.

Following his departure from the Air Council, Henderson returned to France where he served until October 1918. After the armistice, Henderson served as a military counsellor during the Paris Peace Conference until the signing of the Versailles Treaty in June 1919. Henderson then became Director-General of the League of Red Cross Societies in Geneva, where he died in 1921, aged 59.

Honours
Henderson was awarded the Distinguished Service Order in 1902 for his work during the Second Boer War.

In April 1914 he was created Knight Commander of the Order of the Bath (KCB). In March 1918, Henderson accepted the honorary position of Colonel of the Highland Light Infantry.

References

Sources

External links

Oxford Dictionary of National Biography – Henderson, Sir David (requires login)
Centre for First World War Studies, Birmingham University – Sir David Henderson
University of Glasgow – biography
thePeerage.com – Lt. Gen. Sir David Henderson

|-

|-
 

|-

|-

|-
 

|-
 

|-

|-

|-

1862 births
1921 deaths
Alumni of the University of Glasgow
British Army personnel of the Mahdist War
British Army personnel of the Second Boer War
Royal Flying Corps officers
British Army generals of World War I
Royal Air Force generals of World War I
Companions of the Distinguished Service Order
Knights Commander of the Order of the Bath
Knights Commander of the Royal Victorian Order
Military personnel from Glasgow
Graduates of the Royal Military College, Sandhurst
Argyll and Sutherland Highlanders officers
Grand Officiers of the Légion d'honneur
Grand Officers of the Order of the Crown (Belgium)
British Army lieutenant generals
Graduates of the Staff College, Camberley